is a former Japanese football player and manager.

Playing career
Yanagida was born in Tokyo on December 9, 1970. After graduating from Soka University, he played for Fujitsu (1993–1995) and Mito HollyHock (1997–1998) as midfielder.

Coaching career
In 1999, Yanagida became coach for Mito HollyHock. In 2000, he moved to Oita Trinita. He mainly served as a coach for top team and youth team for long time. In June 2015, top team manager Kazuaki Tasaka was sacked for poor results when Trinita was at the bottom place of 22 clubs in J2 League. Yanagida became a new manager as Tasaka successor. However Trinita finished at the 21st place and was relegated to J3 League. He also resigned end of 2015 season.

Club statistics

Managerial statistics

References

External links

soccerway.com

1970 births
Living people
Sōka University alumni
Association football people from Tokyo
Japanese footballers
Japan Football League (1992–1998) players
Kawasaki Frontale players
Mito HollyHock players
Japanese football managers
J2 League managers
Oita Trinita managers
Association football midfielders